Milton, Hampshire may refer to 

 New Milton
 Milton, Portsmouth